Luksika Kumkhum and Erika Sema were the defending champions, having won the event in 2013, but Kumkhum chose not to participate. Sema partnered with her sister Yurika Sema, but they lost in the first round.

Jarmila Gajdošová and Arina Rodionova won the tournament, defeating Misaki Doi and Hsieh Shu-ying in the final, 6–3, 6–3.

Seeds

Draw

References 
 Draw

Kangaroo Cup - Doubles
2014 in Japanese tennis
Kangaroo Cup